Antti Akseli Laaksonen (born October 3, 1973) is a Finnish former professional ice hockey left winger who last played for the Lukko of the SM-Liiga. Antti had a seven-year NHL career, mostly as a third line wing and penalty killer for the Boston Bruins, Minnesota Wild and Colorado Avalanche.

Playing career
Laaksonen left Finland for North America in 1993 as a junior pro from the SM-Liiga. He enrolled at the University of Denver where he played four seasons for the Pioneers. Laaksonen was selected 191st overall by the Boston Bruins in the 1997 NHL Entry Draft. In 1997–98, Laaksonen made his professional debut in North America, playing with both the Charlotte Checkers of the ECHL and the Bruins affiliate, the Providence Bruins.

Laaksonen made his NHL debut with the Bruins at the start of the 1998–99 season, playing in 11 games before he was sent down to Providence where he helped the Bruins capture the Calder Cup.  Unable to become a regular with the Bruins by the end of the 1999–2000 season Laaskonen left the Bruins as a free agent.

On July 14, 2000, Laaksonen signed with the Minnesota Wild for their inaugural season. Antti became a fixture in the Wild offense resulting in four seasons with the Wild.

On July 2, 2004, Laaksonen was signed as a free agent by the Colorado Avalanche to a two-year contract. With the 2004–05 NHL lockout, Laaksonen played his first game with the Avalanche in their season opener for the 2005–06 season. Laaksonen established career highs with the Avalanche, scoring 16 goals and 34 points. On June 28, 2006, the Avalanche exercised their option for the 2006–07 season. During the season, however, a poor run of form led Laaksonen to be demoted to the Avalanche's affiliate, the Albany River Rats of the AHL.

At season's end, Laaksonen left North America and signed with Swiss team HC Fribourg-Gottéron of the NLA on June 18, 2007.  After only one season with Gottéron he returned to his native Finland and signed with Lukko of the SM-Liiga. In his second season with Lukko, Laaksonen captained the team in its return to the post-season before retiring and settling in Minnesota, where he enjoyed the majority of his NHL success.

Career statistics

Regular season and playoffs

International

Awards and honors

References

External links
 

1973 births
Albany River Rats players
Boston Bruins draft picks
Boston Bruins players
Charlotte Checkers (1993–2010) players
Colorado Avalanche players
Denver Pioneers men's ice hockey players
Finnish ice hockey left wingers
HC Fribourg-Gottéron players
HPK players
Ice hockey players at the 2006 Winter Olympics
Living people
Lukko players
Minnesota Wild players
Olympic ice hockey players of Finland
Olympic silver medalists for Finland
People from Tammela, Finland
Providence Bruins players
Olympic medalists in ice hockey
Medalists at the 2006 Winter Olympics
Sportspeople from Kanta-Häme